Jean Heywood (born Jean Murray; 15 July 1921 – 14 September 2019) was a British actress. 

Born in Blyth, Northumberland, in July 1921, Heywood appeared in films such as Billy Elliot and Our Day Out. Her TV work included roles in When the Boat Comes In, All Creatures Great and Small, Boys from the Blackstuff, Family Affairs, The Bill and Casualty. In 2005, she starred alongside Richard Briers and Kevin Whately in a drama called Dad on BBC One as part of Comic Relief's Elder Abuse campaign. In 2010 Heywood made a guest appearance in the ITV series Married Single Other.

Career
Heywood appeared in many roles, mainly in television but also in films such as Billy Elliot.

Personal life
At age six, Heywood moved with her parents, Jack and Elsie, to New Zealand. Her mother died less than six months later, and the family returned to the UK.

Heywood died in September 2019 at the age of 98. Her husband, Roland, had predeceased her (in 1996). They had two children together, and Heywood had another from an earlier relationship.

Filmography

 When the Boat Comes In (1976–77) as Bella Seaton
 Our Day Out (1977) as Mrs Kay
 Emmerdale Farm (1978) as Phyllis Acaster
 Boys from the Blackstuff (1982) E5 “George’s Last Ride” as Mary Malone.
 No Place Like Home (1984) as Lillian (Beryl's mother)
 Dalgliesh (TV series) Cover Her Face  (1985) as Martha   
 A Very Peculiar Practice (1986) as Lillian Hubbard
 Miss Marple: Sleeping Murder (1987) as Edie Pagett
 All Creatures Great and Small (1990) as Mrs Alton
 The Glass Virgin as Amy
 A Touch of Frost (1997) Episode: No Other Love, as Olive Walters
 Hetty Wainthropp Investigates (1998) S4:E3 “Digging for Dirt” as Enid Weston
 Billy Elliot (2000) as Grandma
 Brookside (2000) as Kitty Hilton

References

External links
 

1921 births
2019 deaths
20th-century English actresses
21st-century English actresses
Actresses from Northumberland
English television actresses
People from Blyth, Northumberland